The Porc-Épic River is a tributary of the Malbaie River, flowing into the unorganized territory of Lac-Pikauba, in Charlevoix Regional County Municipality, in the Capitale-Nationale administrative region, in the province of Quebec, in Canada. Most of the Porc-Épic River flows into the territory of the Zec des Martres, except for the last  before reaching its mouth.

The hydrographic slope of the Porc-Épic River is served mainly by a secondary forest road that goes up this valley for forestry and recreational tourism purposes.

Forestry is the main economic activity of the sector; recreational tourism activities, second.

The surface of the Porc-Épic River is usually frozen from early December to late March, however, safe ice movement is generally from mid-December to mid-March.

Geography 
The mouth of the Porc-Épic River is located between the territories of the Grands-Jardins National Park and Hautes-Gorges-de-la-Rivière-Malbaie National Park; between Ha! Ha! Lake and the Lac des Martres.

The main hydrographic slopes near the Porc-Épic River are:
 north side: Malbaie River, Cran Rouge Creek, Moreau Lake, Des Martres River;
 east side: Beaulieu Lake, Lac des Martres, Barley Lake, Rivière du Gouffre;
 south side: Cold Creek, Hache Lake, Coq Lake, Barley River, Malbaie River;
 west side: Malbaie River, La Cruche Lake, La Cruche River, Ha! Ha! River.

The Porc-Épic River originates at the mouth of Lac de la Hache. The mouth of this lake is located at:
  west of a bay of Lac des Martres;
  east of a curve of the Malbaie River;
  northeast of the Barley [river];
  south-west of Beaulieu Lake;
  northwest of Little Malbaie Lake, head lake of the Little Malbaie River;
  south-west of a curve of the upper course of the Rivière du Gouffre;
  south-east of the confluence of the Porc-Épic River and the Malbaie River.

From its source (Pimpant Lake), the Porc-Épic River descends on  entirely in forested and mountainous zones, with a difference of  according to the following segments:
  northerly crossing an unidentified lake surrounded by marshes, up to the discharge (coming from the east) of Beaulieu Lake;
  in a steep valley, first to the north, curving east, then north again, collecting a stream (from the northwest), a stream (coming from the northeast);
  to the northwest forming two small hooks, to the discharge (from the east) of the lake of the titmouse;
  northwesterly to the outlet (from the north) of an unidentified lake enclosed by mountains;
  westerly in a steep valley to its mouth.

The Porc-Épic River flows into a swirl zone on the west bank of the Malbaie River. This confluence is located at:
  upstream of the mouth of the La Cruche River;
  northeast of the mouth of La Cruche Lake;
  east of the Ha! Ha! River;
  north-west of lac des Martres;
  southeast of Little Ha! Ha! Lake;
  west of the confluence of the Malbaie River and the St. Lawrence River.

Toponymy 
The name "Porc-Épic River" appears in the Dictionary of Rivers and Lakes of the Province of Quebec, 1925, page 141. This name was approved on 1963-07-03 by the Commission de géographie du Québec.

The toponym "Porc-Épic River" was formalized on December 5, 1968, at the Bank of Place Names of the Commission de toponymie du Quebec.

See also 

La Malbaie, a city
List of rivers of Quebec

References 

Rivers of Capitale-Nationale
Charlevoix Regional County Municipality